S. K. Kamaruddin (born 25 July 1992) is an Indian cricketer. He made his List A debut for Andhra in the 2016–17 Vijay Hazare Trophy on 6 March 2017.

References

External links
 

1992 births
Living people
Indian cricketers
Andhra cricketers
Place of birth missing (living people)